Pocadicnemis pumila is a species of dwarf spider in the family Linyphiidae. It is found in North America, Europe, Turkey, Caucasus, a range from Russia (European to Far East), and Japan.

References

Linyphiidae
Articles created by Qbugbot
Spiders described in 1841